Daniel de Jesús Vargas Sánchez (born March 6, 1984) is a Mexican long-distance runner. He competed in the marathon at the 2012 and 2016 Olympics and finished 39th and 54th, respectively.

Vargas is married to Hortensia and has one daughter. His brother Gualberto Vargas Sanchez is also a long-distance runner. His father died four days before the 2016 Houston Marathon, where he was supposed to qualify for the 2016 Olympics. Depressed, he failed to meet the qualification time, but was selected for the Olympic after a special meeting of the selection committee.

References

1984 births
Living people
Mexican male long-distance runners
Mexican male marathon runners
Sportspeople from León, Guanajuato
Olympic athletes of Mexico
Athletes (track and field) at the 2012 Summer Olympics
Athletes (track and field) at the 2015 Pan American Games
Central American and Caribbean Games medalists in athletics
Pan American Games competitors for Mexico
21st-century Mexican people